Spring Lake Regional Park is a  public park in southeastern Santa Rosa, Sonoma County, California, United States. Centered on the Santa Rosa Creek Reservoir, the park is administered by the Sonoma County Regional Parks Department.

General information

Hours
The park opens daily at 7am and closes at sunset.

Parking
$7 per vehicle for day use. Vehicles with 9 or more are $1.00 per person.

Dogs
Rabies certificate required. Dogs are not allowed around the swimming lagoon area including the swimming lagoon itself as well as the beach. Dogs are allowed on the grass, on the paths and in Spring Lake.

Camping
Spring Lake offers individual and group camping. The campground is open seven days a week from May 1 through September 30.  During the rest of the year, it is only open on weekends and holidays.

Swimming
In addition to the  reservoir (where people can boat and fish) there is  swimming lagoon with sandy beach and concession stand.  The swimming lagoon is staffed by lifeguards and is open from Memorial Day weekend through Labor Day.

Boating
The lake is open year-round to windsurf, canoe or paddle boat. No gas-powered boats are allowed on the lake, but electric motors are allowed. Lifejackets or personal flotation devices (PFD) are required by all boaters regardless of age or swimming ability. This is due to a county ordinance.

Picnics
There are 200 picnic tables with barbecues located throughout the park, plus four group picnic areas which may be reserved.

Trails

Spring Lake is used by hikers, joggers and strollers.  Trails connect to neighboring Howarth Park and Annadel State Park, creating an outstanding  recreational facility. Bird-watchers use these trails to observe geese, egrets, herons, hawks, woodpeckers, jays, warblers, and sparrows on the reservoir and in the surrounding woodlands.

Equestrian trails follow the perimeter of the reservoir and connect with trails in Annadel State Park.  Mounts are not provided.

Environmental Discovery Center
The Environmental Discovery Center at Spring Lake Regional Park features interactive exhibits about Sonoma County's plants, animals and natural resources, and a tide pool with live, touchable sea creatures. Programs are offered for children, families and schools and focus on environmental conservation and stewardship.

The Discovery Center is a partnership established by the Sonoma County Regional Parks Foundation and the Sonoma County Water Agency. Other sponsors include area government agencies and environmental groups.

See also
 Annadel State Park
 List of Sonoma County Regional Parks facilities
 Santa Rosa Creek
 Spring Creek (Sonoma County, California)

References

External links
 
 photo gallery
 Environmental Discovery Center

Parks in Sonoma County, California
Regional parks in California
Nature centers in California
Sonoma Mountains
Bay Area Ridge Trail